Team Indie is a crossover video game developed by Brightside Games in collaboration with various indie game developers.

Plot 
One day, a man and his cat Oskar receive a package with another cat named Marvin. Feeling fear for being replaced, Oskar has an argument with Marvin, and rips his necklace off. And for an unknown circumstance, Marvin ends up trapped in the video game world. Now, Marvin has to team up with other video game characters in order to return to the real world, but Oskar has other plans.

Characters

Original characters
 Marvin
 Oskar

Featured characters

Receptions
Marcus Estrada of HardcoreGamer gave the game 2/5 calling it unique and competent, however not as good as the original games of the characters. Sander Hölsgens of Gamer gave the game 5.5/10 and noted that game has subpar level design and little interesting gameplay besides the time manipulation.

References

2014 video games
Crossover video games
Windows games
MacOS games
Platform games
Single-player video games